Negative Capability is the twenty-first studio album by British singer Marianne Faithfull. It was released on 2 November 2018, and produced by Rob Ellis, Warren Ellis and Head. Described as her "most honest album", songs on Negative Capability deal with themes of love, death, as well as terrorism and loneliness. She revisits three old recordings: "It's All Over Now, Baby Blue" from Rich Kid Blues, recorded in 1971 under the title Masques, which is her 'lost' album and was not released until 1985; "Witches Song", from 1979's comeback album Broken English; and "As Tears Go By", which started her career as a 17-year-old. Faithfull recorded it for the second time aged 40 on 1987's Strange Weather. The rest of the songs are, with one exception, all new and co-written by Faithfull with help from some of her long time collaborators like Nick Cave and Ed Harcourt. The "Loneliest Person" is a cover of a Pretty Things composition from their 1968 album S.F. Sorrow.

The lead single, "The Gypsy Faerie Queen", was released on 14 September 2018.

Background and development
The album was first announced in December 2017 in Faithfull's interview with Uncut. The album's title is a reference to the famous phrase "negative capability" used by Romantic poet John Keats in 1817 in a letter to his brothers.

Music and lyrics
Described by Faithfull as "the most honest record she's ever made", Negative Capability has a "folky" feel. "They Come at Night" was written with Mark Lanegan following the November 2015 Paris attacks. Faithfull said she got the idea from producer Hal Willner, and his theory that every seventy years the Nazis return in some form or another. She debuted the song during her concert at the Bataclan theatre in November 2016, a year after the terrorist attack took its place there.

Artwork and packaging
Shot by Yann Orhan, the cover art for the album was released on 5 September 2018.

Singles
On 13 September 2018, "The Gypsy Faerie Queen" was serviced to several radio stations in Europe as the album's lead single. It was released to online music stores on 14 September 2018 along with the album becoming available for pre-order.

Critical reception

Negative Capability was met with "universal acclaim" reviews from critics. At Metacritic, which assigns a weighted average rating out of 100 to reviews from mainstream publications, this release received an average score of 88 based on 14 reviews.

Writing for AllMusic, Mark Deming explained: "The performance on Negative Capability comes from a vocalist who has learned a lot more about love, heartache, and the good and bad places that fate can take you than the 18-year-old ever imagined she could know. It's more than a little rueful, but also full of hard-won wisdom, and the rough edges of her voice only add to the resonance of the performance." Cameron Cook of Crack Magazine wrote: "On her 21st solo album Negative Capability, her husky voice grazes atop a pruned collection of 10 songs, some new, some revisited, but all bearing her trademark haunting aura." Mark Beaumont of NME said: "Marianne husks in a last love letter to old friends and lovers. It doesn’t define ‘Negative Capability’, however; the record might read like a last testament, but it bristles with warmth and life, a 40-minute reason to stay positive."

Track listing

Personnel
 Marianne Faithfull – vocals (1-13)
 Nick Cave – backing vocals (1), additional vocals (2), piano (2) 
Rob McVey - guitar (1,2,3,4,7,8,9,10, 11,12,13), piano (7), synthesiser (7), backing vocals (2)
Ed Harcourt - piano (1,3,5,6,9,10,11,12), bass guitar (2,10,11,12), baritone guitar (3,8,13), keyboards (4), wurlitzer (5,6), rhodes (7), organ (7), harmonium (10,12), backing vocals (2,4,9,10,12)
Warren Ellis - viola (1,2,10,12), synthesiser (1,7,8,9,13), violin (3,7,11), keyboards (4,11), piano (4,7), synthesiser bass (4), alto flute (5,6,9), backing vocals (1,2,4), producer
Rob Ellis - drums (2,4,8,11,13), percussion (2,3,4,7,8,9,11,13), synthesiser (4,8,13), piano (4,7), bass synthesiser (5,6), glockenspiel (10,12), thumbjam synthesiser (13), backing vocals (1,2,4), producer
Head - producer

Charts

Weekly charts

Year-end charts

References

External links
 

2018 albums
Marianne Faithfull albums